Eduardo Santos (born April 22, 1983 in São Paulo) is a Brazilian judoka, who played for the middleweight category. He won the bronze medal for his category at the 2010 South American Games in Medellín, Colombia.

Santos represented Brazil at the 2008 Summer Olympics in Beijing, where he competed for the men's middleweight class (90 kg). He reached only into the quarterfinal round, where he lost to France's Yves-Matthieu Dafreville, who was able to score an ippon before the match stopped in the fifth minute. Santos offered another shot for the bronze medal through the repechage bout; however, he finished only in seventh place, losing to Switzerland's Sergei Aschwanden by a superiority decision from the judges.

References

External links

 
 

 Profile – UOL Esporte 
 NBC Olympics Profile

Living people
Olympic judoka of Brazil
Judoka at the 2008 Summer Olympics
Sportspeople from São Paulo
1983 births
Brazilian male judoka
South American Games bronze medalists for Brazil
South American Games medalists in judo
Competitors at the 2010 South American Games
20th-century Brazilian people
21st-century Brazilian people